WPSA may refer to:
 Western Political Science Association, American scholarly organization
 Wildlife Preservation Society of Australia, Australian environmental conservation organisation
 Women's Professional Soccer Association, American top-flight women's soccer league
 Workers Party of South Africa, South African political party
 WPSA (New York), a former student-run radio station at Paul Smith's College
 WPSA-LP, a low-power radio station in Wisconsin
 World's Poultry Science Association, international organization of poultry scientists established in 1912
 Westminster Passenger Services Association, A company operating passenger services on the River Thames between Westminster, Kew, Richmond & Hampton Court.